A voivodeship sejmik, also known as a provincial or regional assembly, is the regional-level elected legislature for each of the sixteen voivodeships of Poland. Sejmiks are elected to five-year terms, decided during nationwide local elections. The size of the legislative assembly varies for each voivodeship depending on the population; in lower populated provinces, there are 30 members, while in the most populous (Masovian Voivodeship) there are 51 members. Elected representatives of an assembly are known as councillors (radni).

Origins
The word sejmik is a diminutive of sejm, a historical term for an assembly of nobles, and is now the name of the lower house of the Polish National Assembly. The word sejmik was consciously chosen by lawmakers during regional reorganization reforms in the 1990s to eliminate the term rada wojewódzka (voivodeship council), as the definition conjured memories of people's councils during the communist People's Republic of Poland era. Initially, elected regional assemblies were created by the government of Prime Minister Tadeusz Mazowiecki under his administration's decentralization programme, with the regional assemblies acting as advisory bodies to the centrally-appointed voivode. Under the administration of Jerzy Buzek in 1998, the contemporary regional assemblies were created by the Sejm with the reorganization of provincial borders and the devolution of powers to the governments of the new voivodeships.

Elections
Assemblies are elected for a five-year term during nationwide local elections. Similar to nationwide elections for Sejm members, councillors for provincial assemblies are elected from party lists using proportional representation within a five percent voting threshold for each individual voivodeship. Following their election and swearing-in, the councillors of an assembly elect a voivodeship marshal (marszałek województwa) and at most two vice-marshals from among their ranks, who, along with normally two other members, will form an executive board (zarząd województwa). The board acts as the collective executive body of the voivodeship, and is the province's de facto cabinet. The assembly additionally elects a chairman and deputy chairmen from among their ranks, who are tasked in organizing the assembly's business and presiding over debates. If the assembly fails to elect an executive board within three months following an election, the legislature must dissolve itself and the voivodeship is obliged to call another election. Earlier elections can also be approved in the event of a public referendum or if the Sejm has dissolved a regional assembly.

Powers
Provincial assemblies can debate, adopt and pass statutes on matters concerning the province which are not reserved for the administration of the central government. Since the end of the 1990s, the powers of the sejmiks and their respective executive boards have grown. These include matters such as economic development strategies, spatial management plans, managing provincially-controlled rail operators, waste and water management, environmental protection, regional heritage protection, voting on the provincial budget, and appointing a supervisory board to manage voivodeship roads. However, sejmiks are unable to enact provincewide taxes to fund internal policies and projects, and remain dependent on the central government for financing such operations.

Throughout its elected term, the assembly reserves the right to hold the marshal and the executive board accountable for their policies. Assemblies can also dismiss the governing marshal upon a three-fifths majority vote of no confidence, after which results in the collapse of the executive board, and a new marshal and board are chosen. Assemblies do not, on the other hand, have a say in the choice nor dismissal of the centrally-appointed voivode for the province.

Assemblies are assisted by the voivodeship marshal's office (urząd marszałkowski), which provides legal, technical, and bureaucratic services to the body.

List

See also 
 Sejmik
 Sejm
 Voivodeship marshal
 Voivodeship executive board

References

Works cited

Government of Poland
 
Politics of Poland
Sejmik
Sejm